The All-NBA Team is an annual National Basketball Association (NBA) honor bestowed on the best players in the league following every NBA season. The voting is conducted by a global panel of sportswriters and broadcasters. The team has been selected in every season of the league's existence, dating back to its inaugural season in 1946. The All-NBA Team originally had two teams, but since 1988 it is typically composed of three five-man lineups—a first, second, and third team.

Since 1956, voters have selected two guards, two forwards, and one center for each team. This contrasts with the voting for starters of the NBA All-Star Game, which has chosen two backcourt and three frontcourt players since 2013. The NBA's sister league, the Women's National Basketball Association (WNBA), announced late in its 2022 season that it was changing the composition of its All-WNBA Teams from the All-NBA format to a "positionless" format in which members are selected without regard to position. NBA players receive five points for a first team vote, three points for a second team vote, and one point for a third team vote. The players with the highest point totals at their respective positions make the first team, with the next highest making the second team and so forth. On one occasion, six players were placed on a team, when Bob Davies and Dolph Schayes tied for the first team in 1952; the second team remained at five.

Voters are instructed to "vote for the player at the position he plays regularly", and some use the flexibility to designate a player at a position which is not their primary role. A player who receives votes at multiple positions is classified at the position in which they received the most votes. This can cause a player to be slotted to a lower team or miss an All-NBA selection altogether. For example, Draymond Green received votes at forward and center in 2016, but he was placed on the second team as a forward although he had more total points than the first-team center, DeAndre Jordan. In 2020, Khris Middleton garnered votes at both forward and guard, yet he was not on the third team despite having more points overall than Ben Simmons and Russell Westbrook, who were selected at guard.

LeBron James has the most All-NBA selections with eighteen. Kareem Abdul-Jabbar, Kobe Bryant, and Tim Duncan previously shared the record with fifteen. James also has the most All-NBA First Team honors with thirteen and the only player to have such in three teams, while Bryant and Karl Malone are tied for second-most with eleven. Malone and James each share a record eleven consecutive first-team selections.

Selections

1946–47 to 1954–55

From the 1946–47 season to 1954–55 season, the All-NBA Team was composed of two teams, each with five roster spots, except when there were ties. During this period, players were selected without regard to position.

1955–56 to 1987–88

From the 1955–56 season to 1987–88 season, the All-NBA Team was composed of two teams, each with five roster spots, except when there were ties. During this time, players were selected with regard to position; they are listed according to position in the following descending order: two forwards, one center and two guards.

1988–89 to present
Since the 1988–89 season, the All-NBA Team has been composed of three teams, each with five roster spots, except when there are ties. Players are selected with regard to position; they are listed according to position in the following descending order: two forwards, one center and two guards.

Most selections 
The following table only lists players with at least ten total selections.

See also
NBA All-Defensive Team
All-ABA Team
All-National Basketball League (United States) Team
All-NBA G League Team

Notes

References
General

Specific

National Basketball Association awards
National Basketball Association lists